Pacific monarch may refer to:

 Pale-blue monarch, a species of flycatcher found in the Solomon Islands
 Buff-bellied monarch, a species of flycatcher found in Indonesia

Birds by common name